Acquafondata (Campanian:) is a comune (municipality) in the Province of Frosinone in the Italian region Lazio, located in the Monti della Meta area, about  southeast of Rome and about  east of Frosinone.

History
During World War II, Acquafondata was occupied by the Germans,  who guarded the Gustav Line on the Cassino side and the Reinhard Line on the Molise side. The liberation of Acquafondata took place on 12 January 1944 by the French Expeditionary Corps who broke through on the Venafro side. Two survivors, Romano Neri and Domenico Mancone, were awarded knighthoods by the Presidency of the Republic for their role in the liberation.

Geography
Located in the middle of a valley and surrounded by the Monti della Meta, the built-up area is located at 926 m asl, on a limestone hillock dominated by Monte Monna Casale, (1395 m asl) in the southern Mainarde area. The valley produces potatoes and legumes. Reclamation work, through the construction of a tunnel for draining unhealthy waters, began in 1882 and saw its completion in 1901. Near the hamlet of Casalcassinese there are the springs of the Rava stream, which flows south-east, in the direction of Pozzilli, before flowing into the San Bartolomeo River, a tributary of the Volturno.

Architecture 
The commune contains the Chiesa parrocchiale di sant'Antonio di Padova, Santuario della Madonna del Carmin, Chiesa di san Rocco and Chiesa di Santa Maria in Centumcellis and a number of notable World War II monuments, including to the Italians and the Polish.

The small sanctuary of the Madonna del Carmine , in the parish of San Giovanni Battista in Acquafondata , stands on the provincial road 41, near the pass of the "Serre ", on the extreme offshoots of the Meta mountains at almost 1000 meters. above sea level.

Sanctuary of Our Lady of Mount Carmel (Acquafondata) 

It is immersed in the green of suggestive pine forests, surrounded by large secular lime trees, is 1 km from the center of Acquafondata and less than 2 km from the border with the municipal area of Vallerotonda . According to tradition, the sanctuary was erected on the site of the apparition of the Our Lady of Mount Carmel to Nicolina Carcillo, which took place on July 16, 1841. 

The sanctuary is a point of reference for Marian devotion , especially in the month of July, for the inhabitants of the neighboring towns and for those who wish to spend time dedicated to peace, relaxation and spirituality. In the evocative setting of an uncontaminated mountain landscape, the visitor restores himself in contact with nature; the pilgrim is favored in personal and community prayer in specially prepared spaces, such as the ascent path to the " Little Mount Carmel " or the "Path of the XII stars".

History 

The foundation of the first chapel dedicated to the Our Lady of Mount Carmel in Acquafondata dates back to 1841 , as can be seen from the date carved in the architrave of the access door. The small rock construction, built in local stone and pozzolana , has a simple barrel vault , made up of stones wedged between them. This first and humble temple is now incorporated under the altar of the new church, built in the 1930s; it houses the valuable wooden image of the Madonna del Carmine dating back to the end of the century. XIX. The sculpture was transported to the parish church of Filignanoa few years after its construction, to safeguard it from the neglect of the church of Acquafondata due to infiltration of the roof. 

Between 1955 and 1960, the structure was recovered, damaged by the war events of the Second World War ; the old chapel, unlike the new church, is not damaged. 

On 5 July 1964 the ancient statue left the parish of Filignano to return to its sanctuary. 

Between 1968 and 1969 the holy water font and the altar were built in the large church, and the marble high relief in the old chapel. Also in 1969 a bell was donated and placed in a single lancet window on the roof, to celebrate the first five years since the statue's return. All of these works are realized at the expense of devoted families and citizens residing in the United States.

In 2014, in memory of the fiftieth anniversary of the return of the statue of the Madonna, a Peregrinatio Mariae took place in the parishes adjacent to the sanctuary, which ended with the solemn coronation of the venerated image, on 30 July of the same year, by the hands of the Apostolic Administrator. or of the territorial Abbey of Montecassino . On 30 July 2015, one year after the coronation, the sanctuary was visited by the first bishop of the new Diocese of Sora-Cassino-Aquino-Pontecorvo . 

In 2017 a precious local stone altar was erected on the lawn in front of the sanctuary, for outdoor celebrations.

The apparition to Nicolina Carcillo 
Oral tradition and some written evidence  trace the foundation of the sanctuary following the apparition of the Our Lady of Mount Carmel to the peasant Nicolina Carcillo (1783-1862).

On July 16, 1841, the day on which the Church commemorates the Blessed Virgin of Mount Carmel, Nicolina and other peasants from Acquafondata go to the fields as a common working day, ignoring the Marian feast. The Virgin Mary appears to the woman and asks her to promote the construction of a chapel that it becomes a point of reference for the people's devotion; asks that from then onwards, on July 16, it be respected with religious practice and with the rest from all work activities. Nicolina is upset, above all she is afraid of not being able to rise to the occasion; in fact, her husband, Benedetto Simeone (1781-1861), is an atheist and will never believe his words, much less help her in the construction of the chapel. Before disappearing, the Madonna leaves her a mark, overturns a huge stone that will be used to convince Benedict and the other farmers. 

The testimony of the event was handed down orally among the inhabitants of the area, who helped to build the chapel requested on the place of the apparition, still today a pilgrimage destination and a reference point for Marian devotion. In 1962, the parish priest Don Ferdinando De Filippis and father Passionist  Fortunato Marsegli   they provided to draw some historical notes on the appearance of 1841, based on the oral tradition, adding reports of other miracles and wonders that the Virgin Mary would operate at the small sanctuary; the news nevertheless remains signs for the believer, interpret-able in the silence of faith and prayer. 

It is difficult to understand how much of this story is really to be attributed to a supernatural manifestation ; the place however remains the object of a particular Marian devotion , the small chapel has acquired the sacred character of a sanctuary because it remains linked to the veneration that Catholics bestow on the Virgin Mary . The small chapel in honor of the Our Lady of Mount Carmel, built in 1841 by the Simeone spouses, together with the small church built after the first construction, have become dear to many devotees, regardless of the veracity of the traditional story. The Church has never been expressed in an official recognition regarding the apparition, however the authorization of the cult in the small chapel, the visits of the Bishops, the celebrations that take place there with the participation of pilgrims and devotees, reveal a factual recognition.

Holidays and anniversaries 
 Easter Monday (Easter Monday ) opening of the sanctuary after the winter break
 the "Ascent of the Madonna" on the first Saturday of July First Saturday of July : pilgrimage on foot of the communities adjacent to the sanctuary for the opening of the month dedicated to the Madonna del Carmine. The statue of the Madonna leaves the parish church of Acquafondata, kept there in the winter, and is carried in procession to the sanctuary.
 From 1 to 16 July : every afternoon at the sanctuary celebration of the Holy Mass and the " sedicina " in preparation for the feast.
 July 16 : (liturgical memorial of Our Lady of Mount Carmel and anniversary of the apparition) evening Mass and torchlight procession accompanying the statue of the Madonna to the parish of Acquafondata.
 Last Saturday  of July : (remembrance of the solemn coronation of 2014) procession from the parish of Acquafondata, the statue of the Madonna returns to the sanctuary and remains there for the whole month of August.
 28 August : Acquafondata pilgrimage on the eve of the patronal feast of the community; from the sanctuary a solemn procession accompanies the statue of the Madonna in the parish church where it will remain kept until July of the following year.
 Indoor 8 December (Immaculate Conception) Concluding celebration at the end of the sanctuary for the winter break.

Note

Bibliography 

 Cassino 2004
 
 Antonio Esposito, Ciociaria and no, the island without the sea, Youcanprint 2016

External links

Cities and towns in Lazio